Gudrun Heute-Bluhm (born  March 17, 1957 in Herne) is a German municipal politician of the CDU. She is a member of the executive committee of the city council of Lörrach, Baden-Württemberg and a member of the federal executive committee of the CDU Germany. 

From 1995 to 2014 she was Lord Mayor of  the town Lörrach and from 2004 to 2014 President of Loerrach International.

Publications 
 Das Dreiländereck – Identität aus Sein und Bewußtsein. In: Badische Zeiten. Redaktion: Hilmar Höhn und Christian Oster. Freiburg im Breisgau: Verlag der Badischen Zeitung, 1999, 264, VIII S., .
 Gudrun Heute-Bluhm, Uwe Vorkötter: Risikokommunikation und Umweltbewußtsein. Die Rolle der Medien. In: Ulrich Müller (Hrsg.): Umwelt und Verkehr. Anstöße – vor Ort. Beiträge zu umwelt- und verkehrspolitischen Themen in Zusammenarbeit mit Kommunen des Landes Baden-Württemberg. Ministerium für Umwelt und Verkehr Baden-Württemberg. Göppingen: Rung, 2000, 178 S.

References

1957 births
Living people
Jurists from North Rhine-Westphalia
Christian Democratic Union of Germany politicians
Mayors of places in Baden-Württemberg
People from Herne, North Rhine-Westphalia